Christophe Jean-Pierre Jallet (born 31 October 1983) is a French former professional footballer who played as a right back. During his career, he played for Niort, Lorient, Paris Saint-Germain, Lyon, Nice and Amiens, as well as registering 16 caps for the France national team between 2012 and 2017.

Club career

Early career
Born in Cognac, Charente, Jallet began his career at his hometown club UA Cognac where he operated behind the striker. Tracked by the main club in the region, Niort, since 13, he was discouraged by his parents to pursue the move and he remained in Cognac.

Niort
Jallet finally joined Niort at 15, but his coach told his parents that he was "not good enough." Jallet dramatically improved after this. Following his training, he started numerous games in National and Ligue 2 during his three seasons as a defensive midfielder there.

Lorient
In 2006, Jallet was transferred to FC Lorient, where he played as the side's third-choice right-back. After a successful tutelage as third-choice, Jallet eventually became a stalwart of the team.

Paris Saint-Germain
On 6 July 2009, Jallet joined Paris Saint-Germain for a transfer fee of 2.5 million euros, signing a four-year contract. He was recruited to provide competition for Ceará at right-back. Jallet made his first appearance in a competitive match with PSG against Le Mans in the second matchday of the 2009–10 Ligue 1 season. Playing as a right midfielder, he scored his first goal one week later against Valenciennes with an assist from Stéphane Sessègnon. During the next match, against Lille, he delivered an assist a few minutes after he was substituted onto the pitch and marked the very end of game again with a goal. During his first season, Jallet's impact as a substitute with goalscoring potential was highly valued, though gaining a starting berth proved hard with the form of Ceará. Jallet scored again at the 19th match against Grenoble, leading to a 4–0 victory for PSG. He ended the season with 11 assists.

On 1 May 2010, at the Stade de France, Jallet won the Coupe de France with PSG after a 1–0 defeat of Monaco in the final.

On 22 April 2011, he renewed his two-year contract with Paris Saint-Germain.

On 2 October 2011, in the clash between PSG and Lyon, Jaillet scored the second goal in a 2–0 victory with an assist from Nenê. He gained the confidence of new coach Carlo Ancelotti in a new position as midfielder, with Ancelotti preferring Milan Biševac at right-back. Jallet gained the captaincy late in the season following the dropping of Mamadou Sakho.

Lyon
On 24 July 2014, Jallet signed a three year deal with Olympique Lyonnais.

Nice
On 18 July 2017, Jallet signed with OGC Nice on a free transfer.

Amiens
On 23 July 2019, Jallet signed with Amiens.

Retirement
Jallet retired after the 2019–20 season, despite Amiens offering to extend his contract for another campaign.

International career
Jallet was called up to the France national team by manager Didier Deschamps for a friendly against Uruguay on 9 August 2012. In his second appearance, on 11 September 2012, he scored a goal against Belarus from a difficult angle. He played a total of 16 matches for the France national team.

International goals
Source:

Honours

Niort
Championnat National: 2005–06

Paris Saint-Germain
Ligue 1: 2012–13, 2013–14
Coupe de France: 2009–10
Coupe de la Ligue: 2013–14
Trophée des Champions: 2013

Individual
Ligue 1 Team of the Year: 2012–13, 2014–15

References

External links

 
 

1983 births
Living people
People from Cognac, France
Sportspeople from Charente
French footballers
France international footballers
Association football defenders
Chamois Niortais F.C. players
FC Lorient players
Paris Saint-Germain F.C. players
Olympique Lyonnais players
OGC Nice players
Amiens SC players
Ligue 1 players
Ligue 2 players
UEFA Euro 2016 players
Footballers from Nouvelle-Aquitaine